Forest of the Hanged is a 1964 Romanian drama film directed by Liviu Ciulei, and based on the eponymous novel by Liviu Rebreanu. Ciulei won the award for Best Director at the 1965 Cannes Film Festival.

Forest of the Hanged became the first Romanian film to achieve wide international recognition.

Cast

 Victor Rebengiuc as Lieutenant Apostol Bologa
  as Ilona
 Ștefan Ciubotărașu as Petre Petre
  as Habsburg General Von Karg
  as Roza Jánosi
 Liviu Ciulei as Captain Otto Klapka
 Costache Antoniu as The Priest
  as Domșa (Marta's father)
 Emil Botta as Captain Cervenko
 Constantin Brezeanu as The Military Prosecutor
 Ion Caramitru as Petre Petre
 Toma Caragiu as Habsburg officer
  as The Army Doctor
  as Lieutenant Sándor Varga
  as Johan Maria Müller
 Gheorghe Cozorici as captured Romanian officer
  as Corporal overseeing gravediggers
  as Marta Domșa
  as a Colonel
  as Paul Vidor (Ilona's father)
 Valeriu Arnăutu as Captain Svoboda
  as an NCO
 Alexandra Polizu as Rodovica
 Radu Dunăreanu as an NCO
 Nicolae Luchian Botez as an Officer
 Constantin Lipovan as a Soldier
 Val Lefescu as The Telegraph Operator
 Marga Barbu
 Angela Moldovan as Sofica Domșa (Marta's mother)

References

External links

1964 films
1960s Romanian-language films
1964 drama films
Romanian black-and-white films
Films based on works by Liviu Rebreanu
Films directed by Liviu Ciulei
Romanian drama films
World War I films set on the Eastern Front
Romanian World War I films